Philodinavidae is a family of rotifers belonging to the order Bdelloidea.

Genera:
 Abrochtha Bryce, 1910
 Henoceros Milne, 1916
 Philodinavus Harring, 1913

References

Bdelloidea
Rotifer families